Dan Waters is a politician in Ontario, Canada.

Dan Waters may also refer to:
Deric Daniel Waters (1920–2016), British scholar, known as Dan Waters on academic publications

See also
Daniel Waters (disambiguation)
Daniel Walters (disambiguation)